is the second solo single by Rino Sashihara, a Japanese idol singer who is part of the AKB48 sister group HKT48. It was released in Japan on October 17, 2012. It features the unit Anrire, whose name is a portmanteau of AKB48 members Anna Iriyama, Rina Kawaei and Rena Katō.

The single charted at number one in the Japanese Oricon weekly singles chart, which made it only the third solo single by an AKB48 member ever to do so.

Background 
The single was released in four versions: Type-A, Type-B, Type-C, and Type-D.

Personnel 
 Rino Sashihara
 Anrire
 Anna Iriyama
 Rina Kawaei
 Rena Katō

Track listing

Type-A

Type-B

Type-C

Type-D 
Mu-mo shop limited edition.

Charts

References

External links 
 Rino Sashihara discography
 

2012 singles
Japanese film songs
Oricon Weekly number-one singles
Songs with lyrics by Yasushi Akimoto
Rino Sashihara songs
Avex Trax singles
2012 songs